Love, Rosie is a 2014 romantic comedy-drama film directed by Christian Ditter from a screenplay by Juliette Towhidi, based on the 2004 novel Where Rainbows End by Irish author Cecelia Ahern. The film stars Lily Collins and Sam Claflin, with Christian Cooke, Tamsin Egerton, Suki Waterhouse, Jamie Beamish and Jaime Winstone in supporting roles.

Plot
Alex and Rosie have been best friends for almost as long as they can remember. During her 18th birthday party, he kisses her, who is drunk, and he realizes that he has romantic feelings for her. The next day, while nursing a hangover and having had her stomach pumped, Rosie regrets having got drunk, and tells Alex that she wishes that the night had never happened. He interprets her words as Rosie just wanting to be friends.

Greg, the "fittest guy in their year", asks Rosie to the school dance. While she originally intended to go with Alex, she accepts Greg's offer when she learns that Alex is thinking about going to the dance with Bethany. After the dance, Rosie has sex with Greg, but the condom slips off inside her.

Rosie aspires to one day run her own hotel, so applies and gets accepted to a hotel management course at Boston College. She rushes to tell Alex but finds him having sex with Bethany, which causes her to vomit. 

Rosie discovers that she is pregnant but refuses to tell Alex, fearing that he will forgo his chance to study at Harvard to help take care of her. After he leaves for the United States, she gives birth to a daughter, whom she names Katie. Alex learns of Rosie's pregnancy from Bethany and becomes Katie's godfather.

Five years later, Rosie visits Alex in Boston and they spend a night together talking and visiting places. The following morning, she discovers that his girlfriend, Sally, is pregnant. She understands that Alex's living situation was not proper and tries to discuss it with him but he rebuffs her, saying that at least their child will have both parents. 

Infuriated, Rosie leaves Boston immediately. She reconciles with Greg, who had initially fled to Ibiza upon learning of her pregnancy, and they eventually marry in 2009. Later, Rosie learns that Alex split from his girlfriend after discovering that the baby was not his. She bumps into Bethany, now a famous model, and suggests that Bethany look up Alex on an upcoming trip to the US.

Another five years pass. Rosie's father dies. Alex attends the funeral, where he reconciles with Rosie. At the same event, Greg behaves immaturely, causing a scene. This later prompts Alex to write Rosie a note saying that she deserves better and that he can be that better man. However, Greg intercepts the note and hides it from Rosie. 

Later, Rosie discovers that Greg is cheating on her and kicks him out. While disposing of his things, she finds the letter from Alex. She calls him, but discovers that Bethany is living with him now and they are engaged. They invite Rosie to be the "best man" at their wedding.

Rosie plots to interrupt the wedding, but fails, as the church ceremony is over by the time she arrives. At the reception, she gives a speech, telling Alex that she will always love him, as a friend. Her daughter, Katie, brings her friend Toby with her to the wedding, in a friendship that is reminiscent of Rosie and Alex when they were children. 

During a dance, Toby suddenly kisses Katie, but she pushes him away and runs outside. Rosie and Alex follow to comfort her and she relates the situation to them. He says she might regret pushing him away, and Toby might never recover and never find someone to replace her. After a moment, Toby finds Katie and apologizes for what he did. As he asks her to forget what just happened, Katie interrupts him with a kiss. 

In that moment, Alex learns that Rosie does not remember the kiss that they shared on her 18th birthday. He realizes that he had been mistaken in interpreting her desire to forget that night as her wanting to stay platonic.

Using her inheritance from her father, Rosie finally fulfills her ambition to start her own hotel. Alex is her second guest. When he arrives, he tells Rosie that he ended his marriage with Bethany, and shares with her a recurring dream he has had about the two of them being together. Finally, they kiss.

Production

Filming began in May 2013 in Toronto before moving to Dublin and Howth.

Cast
 Lily Collins as Rosie Dunne
 Beau Rose Garratt as Rosie (6 years old)
 Lara McDonnell as Rosie (10 years old)
 Sam Claflin as Alex Stewart
 Tighe Wardell as Alex (6 years old)
 Tom John Kelly as Alex (10 years old)
 Tamsin Egerton as Sally
 Suki Waterhouse as Bethany Williams
 Jaime Winstone as Ruby
 Christian Cooke as Greg
 Lily Laight as Katie Dunne
 Rosa Molloy as Katie (5 years old)
 Matthew Dillon as Toby (12 years old)
 Aaron Kinsella as Toby (5 years old)
 Nick Lee as Herb
 Nick Hardin as Joe American
 Jamie Beamish as Phil
 Art Parkinson as Gary Dunne

Reception
Love, Rosie received negative reviews from critics. On Rotten Tomatoes, the film has an approval rating of 32% based on reviews from 57 critics, with an average rating of 4.7/10. The site's consensus states: "Lilly Collins and Sam Claflin are appealing, and they give it their all, but they're undone by Love, Rosies silly, clichéd storyline." On Metacritic, the film has a score of 44 out of 100 based on reviews from 16 critics, indicating "mixed or average reviews".

Donald Clarke of The Irish Times described Collins as "perfectly charming", but felt that "entire film is weighed down by such sloppy storytelling and by equally disordered characterisation" and gave the film one out of five stars calling it awful, but pretty.

References

External links
 
 

2014 films
2014 romantic comedy-drama films
2010s British films
2010s coming-of-age comedy-drama films
2010s English-language films
2010s German films
2010s pregnancy films
British coming-of-age comedy-drama films
British pregnancy films
British romantic comedy-drama films
Coming-of-age romance films
Constantin Film films
English-language German films
Films based on Irish novels
Films based on romance novels
Films set in Boston
Films set in England
Films shot in the Republic of Ireland
Films shot in Toronto
German coming-of-age comedy-drama films
German pregnancy films
German romantic comedy-drama films